Fafnir – Nordic Journal of Science Fiction and Fantasy Research is a peer-reviewed online academic journal published by Suomen science fiction - ja fantasiatutkimuksen seura ry (English: Finnish Society of Science Fiction and Fantasy Research).

The main language of the journal is English, but it also accepts submissions in the Nordic languages. Content ranges from research articles to short overviews, essays, interviews, opinion pieces, conference reports, and academic book reviews.

Abstracting and indexing
The journal is abstracted and indexed in the Modern Language Association Database.

References

External links

English-language journals
Quarterly journals
Publications established in 2014
Science fiction and fantasy journals
2014 establishments in Finland